The 1960 Intercontinental Cup was the inaugural edition of the matchup between the reigning European football champion and the reigning South American football champion. The idea was born of discussions between Pierre Delauney, UEFA secretary and José Ramón de Freitas, CONMEBOL secretary.

The two-legged tie was contested between Spanish club Real Madrid (1959–60 European Cup winner) and Uruguayan club Peñarol (1960 Copa Libertadores winner). The first match-up ended with Los Merengues holding Peñarol to a 0–0 draw at Montevideo's Estadio Centenario, and then soundly winning 5–1 in the return leg at Madrid's Santiago Bernabéu thanks to the marvelous performances of Alfredo Di Stéfano and Ferenc Puskás.

Qualified teams

Venues

Match details

First leg

|valign="top"| 
|valign="top" width="50%"|

|}

Second leg

|valign="top"| 
|valign="top" width="50%"|

|}

See also
1959–60 European Cup
1960 Copa Libertadores
1966 Intercontinental Cup  – contested between same teams
Real Madrid CF in international football competitions

References

External links
Match details and lineups at RSSSF.com

 

Intercontinental Cup
Intercontinental Cup
Intercontinental Cup
Intercontinental Cup (football)
Intercontinental Cup 1960
Intercontinental Cup 1960
International club association football competitions hosted by Uruguay
International club association football competitions hosted by Spain
Inter
July 1960 sports events in South America
September 1960 sports events in the United Kingdom
1960s in Madrid
Sports competitions in Madrid
Sports competitions in Montevideo
1960s in Montevideo